Carbis Bay railway station is on the St Ives Bay Line in Cornwall, United Kingdom and serves the village and beach of Carbis Bay, a community that only adopted this name after the arrival of the railway in 1877. Carbis Viaduct is situated on the St Ives (west) side of the station.

History
The railway needed a viaduct to cross the small valley that carried Carbis Water down to the Baripper Cove. It was decided to build a station on the east side of the valley and call it Carbis Bay. The location proved popular with visitors and the small farms around Wheal Providence mine expanded to become the village of Carbis Bay, named after the station. The station buildings were at the top of the shallow cutting in which the station is built. Goods traffic was withdrawn in May 1956.

Stationmasters 
In 1899, the former station master Richard James was sentenced to 14 days in Bodmin prison for begging after he had got into difficulty through drink and being found begging for alms.

John Tyack until 1885
Edward Ward until 1888
J.C. Richards until 1895 (afterwards station master at Marazion)
John Mann from 1895
Richard James until 1898 
Josiah Martin 1898 - 1907 (afterwards station master at Lelant)
William Henry Pill 1907 - 1920
E.A. Knight 1920 - 1924 (formerly station master at Brixton Road, afterwards station master at Drinnick Mill)
Mr. Roberts 1924 - 1926
Henry White George ca. 1930 - 1931 (also station master at Lelant)
W. Harris 1931 - 1933 (formerly station master at Mary Tavy, afterwards station master at St. Agnes)

Description
There is a single platform situated in a shallow cutting north of the road that leads down to the beach. It is on the left of trains arriving from St Erth. There is a small car park at the station entrance but a larger one is available a short distance away by the beach.

Services
All trains are operated by Great Western Railway.

Carbis Viaduct

Carbis Viaduct is a short distance beyond the station towards St Ives.

References

External links

Former Great Western Railway stations
Railway stations in Cornwall
Railway stations in Great Britain opened in 1877
Railway stations served by Great Western Railway
DfT Category F2 stations